The 1966 State of the Union Address was given by Lyndon B. Johnson, the 36th president of the United States, on Wednesday, January 12, 1966, to the 89th United States Congress. In the speech, Johnson addressed the ongoing war in Vietnam, his Great Society and War on Poverty domestic programs, and other matters.

See also
United States House of Representatives elections, 1966

References

External links 
 1966 State of the Union Address (full video and audio at www.millercenter.org) 

State of the Union addresses
Presidency of Lyndon B. Johnson
89th United States Congress
State of the Union Address
State of the Union Address
State of the Union Address
State of the Union Address
January 1966 events in the United States
Speeches by Lyndon B. Johnson